Ketamine is a dissociative anesthetic used medically for induction and maintenance of anesthesia. It is also used as a treatment for depression, a pain management tool, and sometimes as a recreational drug. Ketamine is a novel compound that was derived from phencyclidine in 1962, in pursuit of a safer anesthetic with fewer hallucinogenic effects.

At anesthetic doses, ketamine induces a state of "dissociative anesthesia", a trance-like state providing pain relief, sedation, and amnesia. The distinguishing features of ketamine anesthesia are preserved breathing and airway reflexes, stimulated heart function with increased blood pressure, and moderate bronchodilation. At lower, sub-anesthetic doses, ketamine is a promising agent for pain and treatment-resistant depression. However, as with many antidepressants, the results of a single administration of ketamine wane with time. The long-term effects of repeated use are largely unknown, and are an area of active investigation.

Liver and urinary toxicity have been reported among regular users of high doses of ketamine for recreational purposes. Ketamine is an NMDA receptor pore blocker and that accounts for most of its actions, except the antidepressant effect, the mechanism of which is a matter of much research and debate.

Ketamine was first synthesized in 1962 and approved for use in the United States in 1970. It has been regularly used in veterinary medicine and was extensively used for surgical anaesthesia in the Vietnam War. Along with other psychotropic drugs, it is on the World Health Organization's List of Essential Medicines. It is available as a generic medication. When used as a recreational drug, it is found both in powder and liquid form, and is often referred to as "Special K" for its hallucinogenic and dissociative effects.

Medical uses

Anesthesia 
The use of ketamine in anesthesia reflects its characteristics. It is a drug of choice for short-term  procedures when muscle relaxation is not required. The effect of ketamine on the respiratory and circulatory systems is different from that of other anesthetics. It suppresses breathing much less than most other available anesthetics. When used at anesthetic doses, ketamine usually stimulates rather than depresses the circulatory system. Protective airway reflexes are preserved and it is sometimes possible to administer ketamine anesthesia without protective measures to the airways. Psychotomimetic effects limit the acceptance of ketamine; however, lamotrigine and nimodipine decrease psychotomimetic effects and can be counteracted also by benzodiazepines administered or propofol.

Ketamine is frequently used in severely injured people and appears to be safe in this group. It has been widely used for emergency surgery in field conditions in war zones, for example, during the Vietnam War. A 2011 clinical practice guideline supports the use of ketamine as a sedative in emergency medicine, including during physically painful procedures. It is the drug of choice for people in traumatic shock who are at risk of hypotension. Low blood pressure is dangerous for people with severe head injury and ketamine is unlikely to lower blood pressure — conversely, often raising blood pressure, making it often the best suited for those with severe head injury.

Ketamine is an option in children, as the sole anesthetic for minor procedures or as an induction agent followed by neuromuscular blocker and tracheal intubation In particular, children with cyanotic heart disease and neuromuscular disorders are good candidates for ketamine anesthesia.

Due to the bronchodilating properties of ketamine, it can be used for anesthesia in people with asthma, chronic obstructive airway disease, and with severe reactive airway disease including active bronchospasm.

Pain 
Ketamine infusions are used for acute pain treatment in emergency departments and in the perioperative period in individuals with refractory pain. The doses are lower than those used for anesthesia; they are usually referred to as sub-anesthetic doses. Adjunctive to morphine or on its own, ketamine reduces morphine use, pain level, nausea, and vomiting after surgery. Ketamine is likely to be most beneficial for surgical patients when severe post-operative pain is expected and for opioid-tolerant patients.

Ketamine is especially useful in the prehospital setting, due to its effectiveness and low risk of respiratory depression.
Ketamine has similar efficacy to opioids in a hospital emergency department setting for management of acute pain and for control of procedural pain. It may also prevent opioid-induced hyperalgesia and postanesthetic shivering.

For chronic pain, ketamine is used as an intravenous analgesic, particularly, if the pain is neuropathic. It has the added benefit of counteracting spinal sensitization or wind-up phenomena experienced with chronic pain. In multiple clinical trials, ketamine infusions delivered short-term pain relief in neuropathic pain diagnoses, pain after traumatic spine injury, fibromyalgia, and complex regional pain syndrome (CRPS). However, the 2018 consensus guidelines on chronic pain concluded that, overall, there is only weak evidence in favor of ketamine use in spinal injury pain, moderate evidence in favor of ketamine for CRPS, and weak or no evidence for ketamine in mixed neuropathic pain, fibromyalgia, and cancer pain. In particular, only for CRPS there is evidence of medium to longer term pain relief.

Depression 

Ketamine is a robust and rapid-acting antidepressant, although its effect is transient. Intravenous ketamine infusion in treatment resistant depression may result in improved mood within 4 hours reaching the peak at 24 hours. A single dose of intravenous ketamine has been shown to result in a response rate greater than 60% as early as 4.5 hours after the dose (with a sustained effect after 24 hours) and greater than 40% after 7 days. Although there are only a few pilot studies studying the optimal dose, increasing evidence suggests that 0.5 mg/kg dose injected over 40 minutes gives an optimal outcome. The antidepressant effect of ketamine is diminished at 7 days, and most people relapse within 10 days, although for a significant minority the improvement may last 30 days and longer. One of the main challenges with ketamine treatment can be the length of time that the antidepressant effects lasts after finishing a course of treatment. A possible option may be maintenance therapy with ketamine which usually runs twice a week to once in two weeks. Ketamine may decrease suicidal thoughts for up to three days after the injection.

An enantiomer of ketamine  esketamine commercially sold as Spravato  was approved as an antidepressant by the European Medicines Agency in 2019. Esketamine was approved as a nasal spray for treatment-resistant depression in the United States and elsewhere in 2019 (see Esketamine and Depression). The Canadian Network for Mood and Anxiety Treatments (CANMAT) recommends esketamine as a third-line treatment for depression.

A Cochrane review of randomized controlled trials in adults with unipolar major depressive disorder, found that when compared with placebo, people treated with either ketamine or esketamine experienced reduction or remission of symptoms lasting 1 to 7 days. There were 18.7% (4.1 to 40.4%) more people reporting some benefit and 9.6% (0.2 to 39.4%) more who achieved remission within 24-hours of ketamine treatment. Among people receiving esketamine, 2.1% (2.5 to 24.4%) more encountered some relief at 24-hours and 10.3% (4.5 to 18.2%) more had few or no symptoms. These effects did not persist beyond one week, although higher dropout rate in some studies mean that the duration of benefit remains unclear.

Ketamine may partially improve depressive symptoms among people with bipolar depression, at 24 hours after treatment, but not 3 or more days. Potentially, 10 more people with bipolar depression per 1000 may experience brief improvement, but not cessation of symptoms, one day following treatment. These estimates are based on limited available research.

In February 2022, the US Food and Drug Administration issued an alert to health care professionals concerning compounded nasal spray products containing ketamine intended to treat depression: "There is no FDA-approved ketamine nasal spray product. Compounded drugs are not FDA-approved, which means FDA has not evaluated their safety, effectiveness, or quality prior to marketing."

Near-death experience 
Most people who were able to remember their dreams during ketamine anesthesia report near-death experiences (NDE) when the widest possible definition of an NDE is used. Ketamine can reproduce features that commonly have been associated with NDEs. A 2019 large-scale study found that written reports of ketamine experiences had a high degree of similarity to written reports of NDE in comparison to other written reports of drug experiences.

Seizures
Ketamine is used to treat status epilepticus that has not responded to standard treatments, but only case studies and no randomized controlled trials support its use.

Contraindications 
Main contraindications for ketamine:
 Severe cardiovascular disease such as unstable angina or poorly controlled hypertension
 Increased intracranial or intraocular pressure. Both of these contraindications are controversial 
 Poorly controlled psychosis
 Severe liver disease such as cirrhosis
 Pregnancy
 Active substance use disorder (for serial ketamine injections)
 Age less than 3 months

Side effects 
At anesthetic doses, 10–20% of adults (1–2% of children) experience adverse psychiatric reactions that occur during emergence from anesthesia, ranging from dreams and dysphoria to hallucinations and emergence delirium. Psychotomimetic effects decrease adding lamotrigine and nimodipine and can be counteracted by pretreatment with a benzodiazepine or propofol. Ketamine anesthesia commonly causes tonic-clonic movements (greater than 10% of people) and rarely hypertonia. Vomiting can be expected in 5–15% of the patients; pretreatment with propofol mitigates it as well. Laryngospasm occurs only rarely with ketamine. Ketamine, generally, stimulates breathing; however, in the first 2–3 minutes of a high-dose rapid intravenous injection it may cause a transient respiratory depression.

At lower sub-anesthetic doses, psychiatric side effects are prominent. Most people feel strange, spacey, woozy, or a sense of floating, or have visual distortions or numbness. Also very frequent (20–50%) are difficulty speaking, confusion, euphoria, drowsiness, and difficulty concentrating. The symptoms of psychosis such as going into a hole, disappearing, feeling as if melting, experiencing colors, and hallucinations are described by 6–10% of people. Dizziness, blurred vision, dry mouth, hypertension, nausea, increased or decreased body temperature, or feeling flushed are the common (>10%) non-psychiatric side effects. All these adverse effects are most pronounced by the end of the injection, dramatically reduced 40 minutes afterward, and completely disappear within 4 hours after the injection.

Urinary and liver toxicity 
Urinary toxicity occurs primarily in people who use large amounts of ketamine routinely, with 20–30% of frequent users having bladder complaints. It includes a range of disorders from cystitis to hydronephrosis to kidney failure. The typical symptoms of ketamine-induced cystitis are frequent urination, dysuria, and urinary urgency sometimes accompanied by pain during urination and blood in urine. The damage to the bladder wall has similarities to both interstitial and eosinophilic cystitis. The wall is thickened and the functional bladder capacity is as low as 10–150 mL.

Management of ketamine-induced cystitis involves ketamine cessation as the first step. This is followed by NSAIDs and anticholinergics and, if the response is insufficient, by tramadol. The second line treatments are epithelium-protective agents such as oral pentosan polysulfate or intravesical (intra-bladder) instillation of hyaluronic acid. Intravesical botulinum toxin is also useful.

Liver toxicity of ketamine involves higher doses and repeated administration. In a group of chronic high dose ketamine users, the frequency of liver injury was reported to be about 10%. There are case reports of increased liver enzymes involving ketamine treatment of chronic pain.

Dependence and tolerance 
Although the incidence of ketamine dependence is unknown, some people who regularly use ketamine develop ketamine dependence. Animal experiments also confirm the risk of misuse. Additionally, the rapid onset of effects following insufflation may increase potential use as a recreational drug. The short duration of effects promotes bingeing. Ketamine tolerance rapidly develops, even with repeated medical use, prompting the use of higher doses. Some daily users reported withdrawal symptoms, primarily anxiety, shaking, sweating, and palpitations, following the attempts to stop. Cognitive deficits as well as increased dissociation and delusion symptoms were observed in frequent recreational users of ketamine.

Interactions 
Ketamine potentiates the sedative effects of propofol and  midazolam. Naltrexone potentiates psychotomimetic effects of a low dose of ketamine, while lamotrigine and nimodipine decrease them. Clonidine reduces the increase of salivation, heart-rate and blood-pressure during ketamine anesthesia and decreases the incidence of nightmares.

Clinical observations suggest that benzodiazepines may diminish the antidepressant effects of ketamine. It appears most conventional antidepressants can be safely combined with ketamine.

Pharmacology

Pharmacodynamics

Mechanism of action 
Pore blocking of the NMDA receptor is responsible for the anesthetic, analgesic, and psychotomimetic effects of ketamine. Blocking of the NMDA receptor results in analgesia by preventing central sensitization in dorsal horn neurons; in other words, ketamine's actions interfere with pain transmission in the spinal cord.

The mechanism of action of ketamine in alleviating depression is not well understood, and is an area of active investigation. Possible mechanisms include direct action on the NMDA receptor, downstream effects on regulators such as BDNF and mTOR, and effects of ketamine's metabolites such as hydroxynorketamine. It is not clear whether NMDA receptor is solely responsible for this action or interactions with other receptors are also necessary. It is not also not clear whether ketamine alone is sufficient for the antidepressive action or its metabolites also are important. In any case, it has been elucidated that acute blockade of NMDA receptors in the brain results in an activation of α-amino-3-hydroxy-5-methyl-4-isoxazolepropionic acid receptors (AMPA receptors), which in turn modulate a variety of downstream signaling pathways to influence neurotransmission in the limbic system and mediate antidepressant effects of NMDA receptor antagonists like ketamine. Such downstream actions of this activation of AMPA receptors include upregulation of brain-derived neurotrophic factor (BDNF) and activation of its signaling receptor tropomyosin receptor kinase B (TrkB), activation of the mammalian target of rapamycin (mTOR) pathway, deactivation of glycogen synthase kinase 3 (GSK-3), and inhibition of the phosphorylation of the eukaryotic elongation factor 2 (eEF2) kinase. In addition to blockade of the NMDA receptor, the active metabolite of ketamine hydroxynorketamine, which does not interact importantly with the NMDA receptor, but nonetheless indirectly activates AMPA receptors similarly, may also or alternatively be involved in the rapid-onset antidepressant effects of ketamine. Recent research has elucidated that an acute inhibition of the lateral habenula, a part of the brain in the limbic system that has been referred to as the "anti-reward center" (projecting to and inhibiting the mesolimbic reward pathway and modulating other limbic areas), may be involved in the antidepressant effects of ketamine.

Ketamine is a mixture of equal amounts of two enantiomers: esketamine and arketamine. Esketamine is a more potent NMDA receptor pore blocker and dissociative hallucinogen than arketamine. Because of the hypothesis that NMDA receptor antagonism underlies the antidepressant effects of ketamine, esketamine was developed as an antidepressant. However, multiple other NMDA receptor antagonists, including memantine, lanicemine, rislenemdaz, rapastinel, and 4-chlorokynurenine, thus far have failed to demonstrate sufficient effectiveness for depression. Furthermore, animal research indicates that arketamine, the enantiomer with a weaker NMDA receptor antagonism, as well as (2R,6R)-hydroxynorketamine, the metabolite with negligible affinity for the NMDA receptor, but a  potent alpha-7 nicotinic receptor antagonist may have antidepressive action. It is now argued that NMDA receptor antagonism may not be primarily responsible for the antidepressant effects of ketamine.

Molecular targets

Ketamine principally acts as a pore blocker of the NMDA receptor, an ionotropic glutamate receptor.  The S(+) and R(–) stereoisomers of ketamine bind to the dizocilpine site of the NMDA receptor with different affinities, the former showing approximately 3- to 4- fold greater affinity for the receptor than the latter. As a result, the S isomer is a more potent anesthetic and analgesic than its R counterpart.

Ketamine may interact with and inhibit the NMDAR via another allosteric site on the receptor.

With a couple of exceptions, ketamine actions at other receptors are far weaker than ketamine's antagonism of the NMDA receptor (see the activity table to the right).

Although ketamine is a very weak ligand of the monoamine transporters (Ki > 60 μM), it has been suggested that it may interact with allosteric sites on the monoamine transporters to produce monoamine reuptake inhibition. However, no functional inhibition (IC50) of the human monoamine transporters has been observed with ketamine or its metabolites at concentrations of up to 10,000 nM. Moreover, animal studies and at least three human case reports have found no interaction between ketamine and the monoamine oxidase inhibitor (MAOI) tranylcypromine, which is of importance as the combination of a monoamine reuptake inhibitor with an MAOI can produce severe toxicity such as serotonin syndrome or hypertensive crisis. Collectively, these findings shed doubt on the involvement of monoamine reuptake inhibition in the effects of ketamine in humans. Ketamine has been found to increase dopaminergic neurotransmission in the brain, but instead of being due to dopamine reuptake inhibition, this may be via indirect/downstream mechanisms, namely through antagonism of the NMDA receptor.

Whether ketamine is an agonist of D2 receptors is controversial. Early research by the Philip Seeman group found ketamine to be a D2 partial agonist with the potency similar to that of its NMDA receptor antagonism. However, later studies by different researchers found the affinity of ketamine of >10 μM for the regular human and rat D2 receptors, Moreover, whereas D2 receptor agonists such as bromocriptine are able to rapidly and powerfully suppress prolactin secretion, subanesthetic doses of ketamine have not been found to do this in humans and in fact, have been found to dose-dependently increase prolactin levels. Imaging studies have shown mixed results on inhibition of striatal [11C] raclopride binding by ketamine in humans, with some studies finding a significant decrease and others finding no such effect. However, changes in [11C] raclopride binding may be due to changes in dopamine concentrations induced by ketamine rather than binding of ketamine to the D2 receptor.

Relationships between levels and effects 
Dissociation and psychotomimetic effects are reported in people treated with ketamine at plasma concentrations of approximately 100 to 250 ng/mL (0.42–1.1 μM). The typical intravenous antidepressant dosage of ketamine used to treat depression is low and results in maximal plasma concentrations of 70 to 200 ng/mL (0.29–0.84 μM). At similar plasma concentrations (70 to 160 ng/mL; 0.29–0.67 μM) it also shows analgesic effects. In 1–5 minutes after inducing anesthesia by a rapid intravenous injection of ketamine, its plasma concentration reaches as high as 60–110 μM. When the anesthesia was maintained using nitrous oxide together with continuous injection of ketamine, the ketamine concentration stabilized at approximately 9.3 μM. In an experiment with purely ketamine anesthesia, people began to awaken once the plasma level of ketamine decreased to about 2,600 ng/mL (11 μM) and became oriented in place and time when the level was down to 1,000 ng/mL (4 μM). In a single-case study, the concentration of ketamine in cerebrospinal fluid, a proxy for the brain concentration, during anesthesia varied between 2.8 and 6.5 μM and was approximately 40% lower than in plasma.

Pharmacokinetics 
Ketamine can be absorbed by many different routes due to both its water and lipid solubility. Intravenous ketamine bioavailability is 100% by definition, intramuscular injection bioavailability is slightly lower at 93%, and epidural bioavailability is 77%. Subcutaneous bioavailability has never been measured, but is presumed to be high. Among the less invasive routes, the intranasal route has the highest bioavailability (45–50%) and oral – the lowest (16–20%). Sublingual and rectal bioavailabilities are intermediate at approximately 25–50%.

After absorption ketamine is rapidly distributed into the brain and other tissues. The plasma protein binding of ketamine is variable at 23 to 47%.

In the body ketamine undergoes extensive metabolism. It is biotransformed by CYP3A4 and CYP2B6 isoenzymes into norketamine, which, in turn, is converted by CYP2A6 and CYP2B6 into hydroxynorketamine and dehydronorketamine. Low oral bioavailability of ketamine is due to the first-pass effect and, possibly, ketamine intestinal metabolism by CYP3A4. As a result, norketamine plasma levels are several-fold higher than ketamine following oral administration, and norketamine may play a role in anesthetic and analgesic action of oral ketamine. This also explains why oral ketamine levels are independent of CYP2B6 activity, unlike subcutaneous ketamine levels.

After an intravenous injection of tritium-labelled ketamine, 91% of the radioactivity is recovered from urine and 3% from the feces. The medication is excreted mostly in the form of metabolites, with only 2% remaining unchanged. Conjugated hydroxylated derivatives of ketamine (80%) followed by dehydronorketamine (16%) are the most prevalent metabolites detected in urine.

Chemistry

Synthesis
2-chlorobenzonitrile is reacted with the Grignard reagent cyclopentylmagnesium bromide to give (2-chlorophenyl)(cyclopentyl)methanone. This is then brominated using bromine to form the corresponding bromoketone, which is then reacted with methylamine in an aqueous solution to form the methylimino derivative, 1-(2-Chloro-N-methylbenzimidoyl)cyclopentanol, with hydrolysis of the tertiary bromine atom. This final intermediate is then heated in decalin or another suitable high-boiling solvent, upon which an Alpha-ketol rearrangement occurs resulting in a ring-expansion, and the formation of racemic ketamine.

Structure 

In chemical structure, ketamine is an arylcyclohexylamine derivative. Ketamine is a chiral compound. The more active enantiomer, esketamine (S-ketamine), is also available for medical use under the brand name Ketanest S, while the less active enantiomer, arketamine (R-ketamine), has never been marketed as an enantiopure drug for clinical use. While S-ketamine is more effective as an analgesic and anesthetic through NMDA receptor antagonism, R-ketamine produces longer-lasting effects as an antidepressant.

The optical rotation of a given enantiomer of ketamine can vary between its salts and free base form. The free base form of (S)‑ketamine exhibits dextrorotation and is therefore labelled (S)‑(+)‑ketamine. However, its hydrochloride salt shows levorotation and is thus labelled (S)‑(−)‑ketamine hydrochloride.

Detection 
Ketamine may be quantitated in blood or plasma to confirm a diagnosis of poisoning in hospitalized people, provide evidence in an impaired driving arrest, or to assist in a medicolegal death investigation. Blood or plasma ketamine concentrations are usually in a range of 0.5–5.0 mg/L in persons receiving the drug therapeutically (during general anesthesia), 1–2 mg/L in those arrested for impaired driving and 3–20 mg/L in victims of acute fatal overdosage. Urine is often the preferred specimen for routine drug use monitoring purposes. The presence of norketamine, a pharmacologically active metabolite, is useful for confirmation of ketamine ingestion.

History 
Ketamine was first synthesized in 1962 by Calvin L. Stevens, a professor of chemistry at Wayne State University and a Parke-Davis consultant. It was known by the developmental code name CI-581. After promising preclinical research in animals, ketamine was tested in human prisoners in 1964. These investigations demonstrated ketamine's short duration of action and reduced behavioral toxicity made it a favorable choice over phencyclidine (PCP) as an anesthetic. The researchers wanted to call the state of ketamine anesthesia "dreaming", but Parke-Davis did not approve of the name. Hearing about this problem and about the "disconnected" appearance of treated people, Mrs. Edward F. Domino, the wife of one of the pharmacologists working on ketamine, suggested "dissociative anesthesia". Following FDA approval in 1970, ketamine anesthesia was first given to American soldiers during the Vietnam War.

The discovery of antidepressive action of ketamine in 2000  has been described as the single most important advance in the treatment of depression in more than 50 years. It has sparked interest in NMDA receptor antagonists for depression, and has shifted the direction of antidepressant research and development.

Society and culture

Legal status 
While ketamine is marketed legally in many countries worldwide, it is also a controlled substance in many countries.

In Australia, ketamine is listed as a schedule 8 controlled drug under the Poisons Standard (October 2015).
In Canada, ketamine is classified as a Schedule I narcotic, since 2005.
In December 2013, the government of India, in response to rising recreational use and the use of ketamine as a date rape drug, has added it to Schedule X of the Drug and Cosmetics Act requiring a special license for sale and maintenance of records of all sales for two years.
In the United Kingdom, it became labeled a Class B drug on 12 February 2014.
The increase in recreational use prompted ketamine to be placed in Schedule III of the United States Controlled Substance Act in August 1999.

Recreational use 

At sub-anesthetic doses ketamine produces a dissociative state, characterised by a sense of detachment from one's physical body and the external world that is known as depersonalization and derealization. At sufficiently high doses, users may experience what is called the "K-hole", a state of dissociation with visual and auditory hallucination. John C. Lilly, Marcia Moore, D. M. Turner, and David Woodard (amongst others) have written extensively about their own entheogenic and psychonautic experiences with ketamine. Turner died prematurely due to drowning during presumed unsupervised ketamine use. In 2006 the Russian edition of Adam Parfrey's Apocalypse Culture II was banned and destroyed by authorities owing to its inclusion of an essay by Woodard about the entheogenic use of, and psychonautic experiences with, ketamine.
Recreational ketamine use has been implicated in deaths globally, with more than 90 deaths in England and Wales in the years of 2005–2013. They include accidental poisonings, drownings, traffic accidents, and suicides. The majority of deaths were among young people. Because of its ability to cause confusion and amnesia, ketamine has been used for date rape.

Research 
Ketamine is under investigation for its potential in treating treatment-resistant depression. Ketamine is a known psychoplastogen, which refers to a compound capable of promoting rapid and sustained neuroplasticity.

A phase 2 clinical study showed that ketamine can safely and effectively reduce levodopa-induced dyskinesia in patients with Parkinson’s disease. A phase II clinical trial is underway to test the use of ketamine as an antidepressant for patients with Parkinson’s disease.

Veterinary medicine 
In veterinary anaesthesia, ketamine is often used for its anaesthetic and analgesic effects on cats, dogs, rabbits, rats, and other small animals. It is frequently used in induction and anaesthetic maintenance in horses. It is an important part of the "rodent cocktail", a mixture of drugs used for anaesthetising rodents. Veterinarians often use ketamine with sedative drugs to produce balanced anaesthesia and analgesia, and as a constant-rate infusion to help prevent pain wind-up. Ketamine is also used to manage pain among large animals. It is the primary intravenous anaesthetic agent used in equine surgery, often in conjunction with detomidine and thiopental, or sometimes guaifenesin.

Ketamine appears not to produce sedation or anaesthesia in snails. Instead, it appears to have an excitatory effect.

References

External links

Ketamine — from the U.S. National Library of Medicine (NLM) Drug Information Portal
Ketamine hydrochloride — from the U.S. National Library of Medicine (NLM)Drug Information Portal
Ketamine fact sheet — from the United States DEA, via Archive.org

Analgesics
Antidepressants
Arylcyclohexylamines
Chemical substances for emergency medicine
Chloroarenes
D2-receptor agonists
Dissociative drugs
Drugs with unknown mechanisms of action
Euphoriants
General anesthetics
Ketones
Muscarinic antagonists
NMDA receptor antagonists
Nicotinic antagonists
Opioid modulators
Sedatives
Sigma agonists
World Health Organization essential medicines
Wikipedia medicine articles ready to translate
Veterinary medicine
Equine medications
Drug-facilitated sexual assault